Sadoveanu is a Romanian name, most often used in reference to writer and politician Mihail Sadoveanu. Other persons with this surname include:
Ion Marin Sadoveanu (born Iancu-Leonte Marinescu), novelist and journalist
Izabela Sadoveanu-Evan (born Izabela Morţun), literary critic, educationist and feminist, Mihail Sadoveanu's sister-in-law
Marietta Sadova (or Marietta Sadoveanu), actress and director, Ion Marin Sadoveanu's wife
Paul-Mihu Sadoveanu, novelist, Mihail Sadoveanu's son
Profira Sadoveanu, novelist and poet, Mihail Sadoveanu's daughter

See also
Mihail Sadoveanu High School

Romanian-language surnames